Laval was a federal electoral district in Quebec, Canada, that was represented in the House of Commons of Canada from 1867 to 1917, 1949 to 1979, and from 2004 to 2015.

Geography
The district included the neighbourhoods of Chomedey, Laval-des-Rapides and Fabreville in the City of Laval. The neighbouring ridings were Papineau, Saint-Laurent—Cartierville, Laval—Les Îles, Rivière-des-Mille-Îles, Marc-Aurèle-Fortin, and Alfred-Pellan.

History
The electoral district of Laval was created in 1867 covering the entire County of Laval (now the City of Laval). In 1914, Laval riding was abolished. The district of Laval—Two Mountains was created from Laval and Two Mountains.

In 1947, the new district of Laval was created from Laval—Two Mountains and Mercier. In 1976, riding was abolished when it was redistributed into Laval-des-Rapides and Mille-Îles ridings.

In 1977, a new Laval riding was created. In 1990, it was renamed Laval West.

In 2003, a new Laval riding was created from Laval Centre and Laval West ridings.

It was abolished for the 2015 election, and dissolved into Vimy and Marc-Aurèle-Fortin.

Members of Parliament

This riding has elected the following Members of Parliament:

Election results

2004-present

1979-1993

See Laval West.

1949-1979

1867-1917

See also
 List of Canadian federal electoral districts
 Past Canadian electoral districts

References

Campaign expense data from Elections Canada
2011 Results from Elections Canada
Riding history from the Library of Parliament:

Laval West

Notes

Former federal electoral districts of Quebec
Politics of Laval, Quebec